Yosvany Suárez Sandoval (or Iosvani Suárez Sandoval, born 20 December 1973) is a retired male hammer thrower from Cuba. His personal best throw is 73.93 metres, achieved in May 2006 in Havana.

Career
He finished thirteenth at the 1992 World Junior Championships, won the silver medal at the 1998 Central American and Caribbean Games, finished ninth at the 2002 IAAF World Cup, won the bronze medal at the 2003 Pan American Games and the silver medal at the 2006 Central American and Caribbean Games. At the Central American and Caribbean Championships he won a silver medal in 1997 and gold medals in 1995, 2003 and 2005. He became Cuban champion in 1999, 2002 and 2003, forming a rivalry with Alberto Sánchez and Yosmel Montes.

Personal best
Hammer throw: 73.93 m –  La Habana, 4 May 2006

Achievements

References

1973 births
Living people
Cuban male hammer throwers
Pan American Games medalists in athletics (track and field)
Pan American Games bronze medalists for Cuba
Athletes (track and field) at the 1995 Pan American Games
Athletes (track and field) at the 2003 Pan American Games
Central American and Caribbean Games silver medalists for Cuba
Competitors at the 1998 Central American and Caribbean Games
Competitors at the 2006 Central American and Caribbean Games
Central American and Caribbean Games medalists in athletics
Medalists at the 2003 Pan American Games
People from Pinar del Río Province
21st-century Cuban people
20th-century Cuban people